The 2004–05 Denver Pioneers men's ice hockey season was the 56th season of play for the program and 46th in the WCHA. The Pioneers represented the University of Denver in the 2004–05 NCAA Division I men's ice hockey season, played their home games at Magness Arena and were coached by George Gwozdecky, in his 11th season. The team won the 2005 NCAA Division I men's ice hockey tournament, the 7th title in program history.

Season
Denver began the defense of its first national championship in 35 years ranked #7 in the pre-season polls. While it was a fairly high ranking, the loss of several key players left the Pioneers with some work to do. The first question was who would replace Adam Berkhoel as the starter in goal. Coach George Gwozdecky had called him the 'best goaltender in the country' the previous year and finding his successor would be critical for the program's chances. While Edmonton draft pick Glenn Fisher had the inside track as a sophomore, training camp ended with Denver alternating between Fisher and Peter Mannino in goal.

Early results were mixed and the Pioneers got off to a sluggish start. After 10 games they sat at .500 but had faced a murderer's row of opponents. Seven of those games had come against top-6 opponents, including three consecutive weeks where Denver earned splits. Though the there were excuses as to why the Pios weren't at their top form, defeating tough competition was exactly what the team would need to do if they hoped to retain their status as champions. The defense, now led by team captain Matt Laatsch, found its consistency in November and helped the team reel off several consecutive victories. As Denver climbed towards the top of the conference standings, they similarly rose in the polls, climbing back into the top-10.

During the winter break, Denver's defense faltered a bit against Minnesota–Duluth. Fortunately, the offense had remained a strong suit for the team. The addition of Paul Stastny helped buoy the offense, led by Gabe Gauthier and Matt Carle.

After capturing the Denver Cup, the Pioneers dropped a stunner to bottom-feeding Michigan Tech. The sizable upset appeared to help refocus the team and sent Denver on another long undefeated streak. The loss to the Huskies ended up being the only defeat the Pioneers suffered over a 20-game stretch. With the platooning of Fisher and Mannino paying dividends in the win column, Denver shot to the top of the standings and earned the #1 ranking by mid-February. The Pioneers saw their streak end against Duluth but then lost the next game to Minnesota State–Mankato and fell to #3. While their ranking wasn't too consequential by then, as they had all but guaranteed themselves a spot in the NCAA tournament, the losses put Denver into a tie with Colorado College for the conference lead. With the two meeting for the regular season finale, Denver had to win the weekend to capture the MacNaughton Cup. Unfortunately, they were shutout by the Tigers in the first game, leaving the team only able to tie for the league crown. A complementary blanking from Mannino helped them do just that and the two long-time rivals were forced to share the regular season title.

Conference Tournament
Though Denver and Colorado College were tied with identical records, the Pioneers held the tiebreaker and received the #1 seed for the WCHA tournament. The team utterly dominated Michigan Tech in the first game but they were pushed hard in the rematch. Despite firing 46 shots on goal, only one got past Cam Ellsworth. Fortunately, Mannino stopped everything that came his way and the team advanced to the conference semifinals.

They met long-time rival North Dakota at the Xcel Energy Center and the two battled through a defensive struggle. Both teams were only able to score a single goal in regulation thanks to their respective power plays. With 60 minutes not enough to settle the score, the two prepared for overtime. While the match was set up to go long into the night, Gauthier ended the match on the first shot of the extra session. In the championship, only Colorado College stood in the Pioneers' way Denver had another defensive struggle on its hands. Despite possessing the #2 offense in the country, the Pioneers could only muster a single goal, again on the power play. Mannino, however, posted his 5th shutout of the season and allowed Luke Fulghum's marker to stand as the game-winner.

NCAA Tournament
Denver sat atop both polls at the end of the season. In spite of this, however, they received the #2 overall seed in the tournament. To make matters worse, Minnesota was the host for the West Regional and, since the Gophers were also a #1 seed, Denver was slotted to open in Amherst, Massachusetts.

The Pioneers' faced CHA tournament champion Bemidji State in the Beavers' first Division I tournament game. While Denver was expected to roll over the unranked BSU squad, the Pios found themselves trailing twice early in the game. Bemidji State fought hard and never let Denver put any distance between the two. Despite being outshout 45–22, the Beavers equaled the Pios with 3 goals in regulation and sent the game into overtime. Denver controlled the play for much of the later portion of the game and they continued into the extra frame. After three and a half minutes the Pios had 5 shots to Bemidji's 1, the last of which found its way into the goal and prevented a stunning upset. The second game for the Pioneers went a little bit smoother. After trading 1-goal leads with New Hampshire, a strong third period allowed the Pioneers to pull away from the Wildcats. The game was capped off by a hat-trick from Gauthier in the waning seconds.

In the Frozen Four, Denver found three of its conference rivals waiting for them. This marked the first time in history, in any sport, that all four teams reaching the National Semifinals all came from the same conference.

As a consequence of Fisher's struggles against Bemidji State and Peter Mannino stronger performance over the course of the entire season, Gwozdecky ended the goaltender rotation and went with his best option in goal. He needn't have worried, however, as Denver trounced Colorado College in the semifinal. The Pioneers outshout the Tigers 43–29 and, more importantly, outscored their in-state rivals 6–2. Most stunning was the fact that all 8 goals in the game were scored on the power play, setting an NCAA tournament record.

For the chance to repeat as national champions, Denver faced an old foe in North Dakota. The two had med three times prior for the national title with the most recent coming in 1968. Jeff Drummond opened the scoring early in the first but Denver's lead was erased just a few minutes later on a power play marker from Travis Zajac. The score remained even until just past the midway point of the game when Stastny added a goal on the man-advantage. It took another 18 minutes for the next goal but it was again Stastny on the power play. Despite a furious assault by North Dakota in the third, Denver's lead held and the game was salted away by Gabe Gauthier's 26 goal of the season into an empty net.

Departures

Recruiting

Roster
As of August 12, 2021.

Standings

Schedule and results

|-
!colspan=12 style="color:white; background:#862633; " | Exhibition

|-
!colspan=12 style="color:white; background:#862633; " | Regular Season

|-
!colspan=12 style="color:white; background:#862633; " | 

|-
!colspan=12 style="color:white; background:#862633; " | 

|- align="center" bgcolor="#e0e0e0"
|colspan=11|Denver Won Series 2–0

|-
!colspan=12 style="color:white; background:#862633; " |

National Championship

(NE1) Denver vs. (E2) North Dakota

Scoring statistics

Goaltending statistics

Rankings

Note: USCHO did not release a poll in weeks 1, 25 and 26.

Awards and honors

Players drafted into the NHL

2005 NHL Entry Draft

† incoming freshman

References

2004-05
Denver Pioneers
Denver Pioneers
Denver Pioneers
Denver Pioneers
NCAA men's ice hockey Frozen Four seasons